Austroagrion cyane, the south-western billabongfly, is a species of damselfly of the family Coenagrionidae.
Despite their common name, they have been found not only in south-western Australia,
but also in diverse locations across Australia.

Habit & Habitat
Austroagrion cyane are permanent residents of aquatic habitats. They prefer slow-moving water. The species grows to around 2–3 cm in length. Females are less common than males and are mostly attracted to ephemeral swamps.

Gallery

References

Further reading

Coenagrionidae
Odonata of Australia
Insects of Australia
Endemic fauna of Australia
Taxa named by Edmond de Sélys Longchamps
Insects described in 1876
Damselflies